Julio Robaina is a state representative from Florida. He was first elected to the Florida House of Representatives in 2003 from District 117. He ran for Florida Senate from District 36, which was being vacated by Alex Diaz de la Portilla, losing to Miguel Diaz de la Portilla, Alex's brother, in the Republican primary.

Robaina was born in Miami, Florida and graduated from South Miami Senior High School and graduated with an associate degree from Miami Dade Community College in 1983. Prior to being elected to the Florida House of Representatives he served as Commissioner, Vice-Mayor, and Mayor of South Miami, Florida.

References

External links
Julio Robaina's Florida House of Representatives profile

Republican Party members of the Florida House of Representatives
1961 births
Living people
Politicians from Miami
People from South Miami, Florida
American politicians of Cuban descent